Santa Balbina is a Roman Catholic basilica church in located in the Aventine rione, adjacent to the Baths of Caracalla in Rome.

History
A church at the site initially was built in the 4th century over the house of consul Lucius Fabius Cilo. Possibly the ancient Titulus Tigridae, the basilica was consecrated to St Balbina (died c. 130) in circa the year 600 by Pope Gregory I. It underwent many revisions since then, including by Pope Gregory III in 751, Pope Paul II in 1464, and by Cardinal Pompeo Arrigoni in 1600. Initially affiliated with Augustinians, the allegiance changed to the secular priests of Naples by Pope Innocent XII.

The adjoining monastery has a commanding medieval defence tower. Inside the basilica there is a very fine episcopal chair with Cosmatesque decoration from the 13th century. The church was heavily restored in the 1930s when frescoes were discovered on the side walls from the 9th to 14th centuries. The Baroque frescoes in the apse and the triumphal arch were painted by Anastasio Fontebuoni in 1599. The triumphal arch is decorated with the figures of Ss Paul and Peter while in the apse we can see St Balbina between other martyrs.

An ancient sarcophagus was also discovered during the restoration. It is now used as a font.

In 1270 the first known Hungarian cardinal, Stephen Báncsa was buried in the basilica. Another 13th-century Hungarian clergyman, Pál, Bishop of Paphos, erected an altar in the church for Saint Nicolas. Both the altar and the grave disappeared during later centuries, but a plaque commemorates the offerings of Pál.

The Cardinal Priest of the Titulus S. Balbinae is Péter Erdő, Archbishop of Esztergom. According to Péter Erdő the Hungarian connections of the church played part in the Pope's decision when he chose Santa Balbina as Erdő's titular church. The Cardinal also recommended Hungarian pilgrims to visit the basilica and said he feels a special responsibility for the building. Among the previous titulars, Alfonso de la Cueva, marqués de Bedmar and Francisco Jiménez de Cisneros.

Father Simpliciano of the Nativity founded the Congregation of the Franciscan Sisters of the Sacred Hearts here.

List of Cardinal-Priests

Gallery

References

Bibliography

External links
 Nyborg, Chris, "Santa Balbina".
 

Basilica churches in Rome
Titular churches
6th-century churches
Churches of Rome (rione San Saba)